The 2019–20 season was the 91st season in the existence of A.C. ChievoVerona and the club's first season back in the second division of Italian football. In addition to the domestic league, Chievo participated in this season's edition of the Coppa Italia.

Players

First-team squad

Other players under contract

On loan

Competitions

Overview

Serie B

League table

Results summary

Results by round

Matches

Promotion play-offs

Coppa Italia

Statistics

Goalscorers

References

External links

A.C. ChievoVerona seasons
A.C. ChievoVerona